Iago Amaral Borduchi (born 23 March 1997) is a Brazilian professional footballer who plays as a left-back for Bundesliga club FC Augsburg.

Club career
Born in Monte Azul Paulista, Iago started his youth career with the academy of local Monte Azul. Although initially, he played as a forward, he later switched to left back position. He moved to the youth setup of Internacional in 2013, at the age of 16.

Ahead of the 2017 season, Iago was promoted to the senior team. On 8 February, he extended his contract until 2020. Fifteen days later, he made his first team debut, starting in a 3–1 victory against Cricúima, in Primeira Liga.

In 2018 season, Iago started playing regularly for the first team owing to the injured Uendel; going on to play even after the latter's recovery. On 23 May 2018, he renewed his contract till 2021.

On 23 June 2019, German Bundesliga club FC Augsburg confirmed, that they had signed Iago on a contract until 30 June 2024.

International career
Iago was called to the Brazil under-20 team for the 2016 Suwon JS Cup.

Career statistics

References

External links
Iago  at Internacional's website

1997 births
Living people
Association football defenders
Brazilian footballers
Campeonato Brasileiro Série A players
Campeonato Brasileiro Série B players
Sport Club Internacional players
FC Augsburg players
Brazil youth international footballers
Brazilian expatriate footballers
Expatriate footballers in Germany
Brazilian expatriate sportspeople in Germany
Brazilian people of Italian descent